Lisabi Grammar School (LGS) is a coeducational public high school in Ogun State, Nigeria. It is situated at Idi Aba, Abeokuta. The school began functioning in 1943. It is one of the oldest schools in Ogun State.

Notable alumni

Bode Akindele, Billionaire, Industrialist, Philanthropist, 
Simeon Borokini, Bishop of Akure
 Tunde Lemo, Former Deputy Governor (Operations), Central Bank of Nigeria
 Lekan Salami, Nigerian Businessman, Football Administrator
 Tunde Bakare, Nigerian Pastor, Lawyer, Activist, Author
 Reuben Abati, Nigerian Journalist, Politician, Television Anchor and Newspaper Columnist
Samson Adeola Odedina, Former Commissioner For Agriculture (Ogun State), Former Rector Moshood Abiola Polythechnic (Abeokuta)
Funmi Babington-Ashaye, Entrepreneur, Author, Mentor, Philanthropist, Former President and Chairman of Council, Chartered Insurance Institute of Nigeria.

See also
List of schools in Abeokuta
Abeokuta Grammar School

References

External links

Schools in Abeokuta
Secondary schools in Ogun State
Government schools in Nigeria
Educational institutions established in 1943
1943 establishments in Nigeria